A list of films produced in Italy in 1984 (see 1984 in film):

External links
Italian films of 1984 at the Internet Movie Database

1984
Films
Italian